The Ballad of Narayama may refer to:

The Ballad of Narayama (novel), a 1956 novel by Shichirō Fukazawa
The Ballad of Narayama (1958 film)
The Ballad of Narayama (1983 film)